Előd Takáts (born 4 November 1975) is a Hungarian economist, professor, former senior economist at the Bank for International Settlements and visiting professor at the London School of Economics and Political Science. He has been serving as rector of Corvinus University of Budapest since 1 August 2021.

Studies 

In 1999, Takáts graduated with honours from the Budapest University of Economics and Business Administration (the predecessor of Corvinus University of Budapest) with a degree in finance, majoring in Economic Policy. In 2002, he obtained a master's degree in economics from the Central European University. He then continued his studies at Princeton University in the US, where he obtained a PhD in finance in 2006.

In addition to his studies, in 2000 he successfully passed the stock exchange examination of the Budapest Stock Exchange.

Professional career 
After graduating, he worked in the securities department of CIB Bank from 1999 to 2000 and as a senior consultant at Postabank (Hungary) from 2001 to 2002. From 2003 to 2005 he worked as a researcher at the Economics Department of the Hungarian National Bank, the European Central Bank and the Federal Reserve Bank of New York, among others.

International Monetary Fund 
As an economist at the International Monetary Fund from 2006 to 2009 he worked in the Western Hemisphere Department from 2006 to 2007. After that he worked in the Strategy, Policy and Review Department from 2007 to 2008 and in the Monetary and Capital Markets Department from 2008 to 2009.

Bank for International Settlements 
He was an economist, senior economist and then chief economist at the Bank for International Settlements (BIS) between 2009 and 2021. Between 2009 and 2016, he worked on emerging markets, and from 2016 his main area of expertise was financial regulation. He represented the BIS in the Basel Committee's Macroprudential Oversight Group and the Financial Stability Board Working Group, and as a member of the Financial Systems and Regulation Unit he provided analysis for international regulatory reforms.

Academic career 
Prior to obtaining his PhD from Princeton University, he taught banking courses in Hungarian at the International Banking Training Centre and Money and Banking in English at the International Business School in Budapest. During his doctoral studies he regularly taught macroeconomics courses with Alan Blinder and an advanced international finance courses with Linda S. Goldberg at Princeton University.

Since 2018, he has been a visiting professor at the School of Public Policy at the London School of Economics and Political Science.

In addition to his work, he was a regular guest lecturer at Corvinus University of Budapest for various courses and conferences. In recognition of this, on 17 September 2019, the Senate of the institution awarded him the title of Professor Emeritus in recognition of his "outstanding teaching, research and development activities."

On 3 March 2021, President János Áder appointed him professor with effect from 10 March 2021.

Personal life 

In addition to his native Hungarian, Takáts speaks English, German and Spanish. He is married and is the father of five: three daughters and two sons.

Publications

International journal publications 
 Előd Takáts – Judit Temesvary: The currency dimension of the bank lending channel in international monetary transmission. Journal of International Economics, 2020.
 Emanual Kohlscheen – Előd Takáts: What can commercial property performance reveal about bank valuations?. Journal of International Money and Finance. 2019.
 Martina Jašová – Richhild Moessner – Előd Takáts: Exchange rate pass‐through: What has changed since the crisis?. International Journal of Central Banking. 2019
 Előd Takáts – Judit Temesvary: Can macroprudential measures make cross‐border lending more resilient?. International Journal of Central Banking. 2019
 Stefan Avdjiev – Előd Takáts: Monetary policy spillovers and currency networks in cross‐border bank lending: lessons from the 2013 Fed Taper Tantrum. Review of Finance. 2019. 
 Martina Jašová – Richhild Moessner – Előd Takáts: Domestic and global output gaps as inflation drivers: what does the Phillips curve tell?. Economic Modelling. 2019.
 Aging and House Prices. Journal of Housing Economics. 2012. 
 A Theory of "Crying Wolf": The Economics of Money Laundering Enforcement. Journal of Law, Economics, and Organization. 2009. 
 Anders Frederiksen – Előd Takáts: Promotions, Dismissals, and Employee Selection: Theory and Evidence. The Journal of Law, Economics, and Organization. 2009.

Books 
 Donato Masciandaro – Brigitte Unger – Előd Takáts: Finance: The economics of money laundering. Edgar Elgar Publishing. 2006

References

1975 births
Living people
Academic staff of the Corvinus University of Budapest
Hungarian economists